Aktion Brandt (Operation Brandt) is an umbrella term for the decentralized killings of sick people in sanatoriums in Nazi Germany. In some institutions, sick people died due to overcrowding and deliberate neglect; in other institutions, the transferred inmates were murdered on a large scale.  The action, named after Hitler's doctor and general commissioner for medical and health services Karl Brandt, partially succeeded Aktion T4.

Notes

 
Nazi eugenics
The Holocaust in Germany
The Holocaust in Austria
The Holocaust in Poland
Law in Nazi Germany
Psychiatry controversies
The Holocaust
Political abuses of psychiatry
Euthanasia law
20th-century mass murder in Germany
Ableism